Kashinath Singh (born 1937) is an Indian writer and scholar of Hindi language and known for writing novels and short stories in Hindi. He was formerly a professor of Hindi literature in Banaras Hindu University. He received the Sahitya Akademi Award in 2011 for his novel Rehan Par Ragghu, and is considered one of the best chroniclers of the city of Varanasi. He has recently received 'Bharat Bharti Award', the state's highest literary award given by U.P. government.

Biography
Kashinath Singh was born in 1937 in the village of Jiyanpur, in Chandauli district of north Indian state of Uttar Pradesh in a peasant family. His early schooling was done at Jiyanpur village school. He continued his education at Banaras Hindu University from where he obtained BA, MA and PhD. He started his career as a lecturer in Banaras Hindu University in 1965 and retired from there as professor and the head of the Hindi department. Singh presently lives with his son in Varanasi in Brij Enclave on Manduadih Road. Renowned critic Dr. Namvar Singh is elder brother of Kashinath Singh. He was a friend and relative of Doodhnath Singh.

Legacy
Kashi Ka Assi, published in 2008, is considered his most significant work. It is written from an insider's portrait of life on the ghats, the oddball characters and the student politicians from the 1970s. The novel is considered to be unique in its detailed portrayal of the colourful life of Varanasi.

Kashinath Singh is also known for his unique style of writing biographies of literary personalities. His memoirs are compiled into the volume Yaad Ho Ki Na Yaad Ho, which won the Sharad Joshi Award. Parts of Kashi ka Assi have been adapted to theatre by eminent director Usha Ganguly and the novel is also being adapted into a feature film, Mohalla Assi, by Chandraprakash Dwivedi.

Kashinath Singh received Sahitya Akademi Award for his novel Rehan Par Ragghu in 2011. In recent times, Kashinama, a play based on Kashi Ka Assi has been staged 125 times in India and abroad.

Works

Awards and recognitions
 Kendra Sahitya Akademi Award
 Sharad Joshi Samman
 Sahitya Bhushan
 Katha Samman
 Rajbhasha Samman
 Bharat Bharti Award

References

External links
 Interview on Gulf News

1937 births
Living people
Indian male novelists
Writers from Uttar Pradesh
Recipients of the Sahitya Akademi Award in Hindi
Hindi-language writers
20th-century Indian novelists
Banaras Hindu University alumni
Indian male short story writers
20th-century Indian short story writers